Naumannella is a bacterial genus from the family Propionibacteriaceae.

References

Propionibacteriales
Bacteria genera
Monotypic bacteria genera